Roman Zolotov (born February 13, 1974) is a former Russian professional ice hockey player who played in the Russian Superleague (RSL). Zolotov was drafted in the sixth round of the 1992 NHL Entry Draft by the Philadelphia Flyers, but he never played professionally in North America. He played 11 seasons in the RSL for HC Dynamo Moscow, HC CSKA Moscow, and Khimik Voskresensk.

References

External links

1974 births
Living people
HC CSKA Moscow players
HC Dynamo Moscow players
HC Khimik Voskresensk players
Philadelphia Flyers draft picks
Russian ice hockey defencemen
Ice hockey people from Moscow